Carrutherstown is a village in the civil parish of Dalton, in Dumfries and Galloway, Scotland.

Demographics
The population data for Carrutherstown is aggregated with neighbouring Dalton and as at 2022 the local authority estimates the combined total to be 333.

References

Villages in Dumfries and Galloway